Six O'Clock Rock was an Australian rock and roll television show broadcast on ABC from 28 February 1959 to 1962 at 6 p.m. on Saturdays.

Program synopsis 
Inspired by the BBC program 6.5 Special, it had a similar format to its rival on the TCN9 network, Bandstand compered by Brian Henderson.  This was ABC-TV's first youth-oriented music program, long before Countdown.

The show initially opened with American girl Ricki Merriman as compère and Johnny O'Keefe and his band The Dee Jays as guests. The Dee Jays consisted of Dave Owens (tenor sax), Johnny "Greeno" Greenan (baritone sax) and Johnny "Catfish" Purser on drums, Keith Williams on bass guitar, and Lou Casch on guitar, Bob "Bluto" Bertles, later a leading jazz  player, substituted as the second saxophone. After six shows O'Keefe took over the hosting role.  The show usually opened with O'Keefe singing "Weeeeeell, come on everybody it's six o'clock, uh  huh huh huh", with The Graduates providing the "bap bap bap bap" background.

The first episode featured Reg Lindsay, The Australian All-Stars, The Graduates, Terry King and Johnny Ball.  The dancers in the opening title sequence were Lee Nielson and Milton Mitchell.

Entertainers who got their first big exposure on Six O'Clock Rock include Lonnie Lee, Barry Stanton and Warren Williams. The Delltones also debuted on this show, which was produced by Peter Page.

The show originally contained a mixture of rock and roll and jazz. The jazz was supplied by the Australian All Stars, featuring Don Burrows on alto and baritone sax, Terry Wilkinson on piano, Ron Webber on drums, Fred Logan on bass, and tenor player Dave Rutledge. The jazz musicians were always a bit uncomfortable with their role, and since O'Keefe insisted on deciding who should be on the show, the jazz numbers were few and far between.  O'Keefe wanted the show to be all rock music.

O'Keefe left the show in 1961 to move to ATN-7 to compère the more elaborately produced Johnny O'Keefe Show. These later shows were compered by Tanya Halesworth and Chet Clark, as seen in an existing 1961 edition. Six O'Clock Rock closed in 1962 after changing to a 'softer' format with O'Keefe's departure, and suffered from competition from O'Keefe's new show on Channel 7 and Bandstand on Channel 9.

See also

 List of Australian music television shows

References

Sources
http://www.johnnyokeefe.com/joktv.htm
https://web.archive.org/web/20070125214125/http://www.whiteroom.com.au/howlspace/en/okeefejohnny/okeefejohnny.htm
Photo of Lonnie Lee on Six O'Clock Rock
"JO'K The Official Johnny O'Keefe Story" Chapter "Terror on TV"

External links
Six O'Clock Rock at the National Film and Sound Archive
50 Year s of ABC-TV Timeline
Six O'Clock Rock at IMDb

Australian non-fiction television series
Australian music television series
Australian Broadcasting Corporation original programming
1959 Australian television series debuts
1962 Australian television series endings
Black-and-white Australian television shows